Vardhman Institute of Medical Sciences (VIMS) / Bhagwan Mahavir Institute of Medical Sciences (BMIMS) is a government medical college situated at Pawapuri, in the Nalanda district of the Indian state of Bihar. It is affiliated with Aryabhatta Knowledge University. Established in year 2011, it offers UG and PG courses in medical field as well as paramedical specilizations across 5 different specializations.

See also

References

External links 
Vardhman Institute of Medical Sciences
Aryabhatta Knowledge University

Medical colleges in Bihar
Hospitals in Bihar
Colleges affiliated to Aryabhatta Knowledge University
Educational institutions established in 2013
2013 establishments in Bihar